Delta Groove Productions is an American blues record label in Van Nuys, California, United States. The label was founded by Randy Chortkoff ( Rand Jay Chortkoff; 1949–2015), a producer, concert promoter, and harmonica player.

Chortkoff's biography 
Chortkoff died on May 5, 2015, while awaiting a liver transplant and sentencing on multiple criminal felony fraud charges, including cheating investors of over $1,400,000 in a phony movie investment scam. In 2016, Chortkoff's co-defendant Sam Braslau was sentenced to seven years in federal prison in Lompoc, California. Co-defendant Stuart Rawitt previously pled guilty and was sentenced to five years in federal prison. Both co-defendants were ordered by the US Court to pay restitution of $1,600,000. In February 2017, the Chortkoff Estate was ordered by the US Court to pay $153,400 in disgorgement and $12,615 in prejudgment interest in the civil matter with the SEC.

Overview and history
The label started with blues by musicians from Los Angeles. Its first release was That Represent Man (2004), the debut album by The Mannish Boys. The label then expanded to other genres. Jackie Payne Steve Edmonson Band's Master of the Game released in 2006  was the label's first release in soul/R&B. The label's releases are newly recorded materials for the most part, but it has also released some albums that were produced by Chortkoff as independent productions and released by the German record label CrossCut (Kirk Fletcher's Shades of Blue and Frank "Paris Slim" Goldwasser's bluju).

Apart from its own releases, Delta Groove Productions produced Roy Gaines' The First TB Album, released by Black Gold in 2003.

In 2007, Delta Groove started a new record label, Eclecto Groove Records, as a home and showcase for other musical styles. In June, 2007, Chortkoff hired industry veteran Robert Fitzpatrick (who died in 2010) to become president of Delta Groove Music and Eclecto Groove Records.

Selected artists

 Arthur Adams
 Elvin Bishop
 Bob Corritore
 Sean Costello
 Kirk Fletcher
 Kara Grainger
 Henry Gray
 Terry Hanck
 Candye Kane
 Smokin' Joe Kubek
 Bnois King
 John Long
 Lynwood Slim
 The Mannish Boys
 R.J. Mischo
 Tracy Nelson
 Jackie Payne 
 Rod Piazza & the Mighty Flyers
 Shawn Pittman
 Ana Popović
 John Primer
 Sugaray Rayford
 Jason Ricci
 Tail Dragger
 Rick Vito
 Phillip Walker
 Monster Mike Welch
 Mike Zito

Delta Groove releases

Eclecto Groove releases

References

External links
 Delta Groove Productions website
 Eclecto Groove Records website
 2014 SEC Criminal Complaint
 Investor Blog on the Movie Scam

American independent record labels
Blues record labels